Weshparkar was the Sogdian god of the Atmosphere and the Wind. He corresponds to the Avestan god Vayu. In Central Asia, Weshparkar has also been associated to the Indian god Shiva.

By the VI-VIII centuries. include numerous scenes of worship of gods in temples, palaces and houses of Penjikent, Samarkand, Varakhshi near Bukhara, Shakhristan (the residence of the ruler of Ustrushana, an area inhabited by Sogdians northeast of Samarkand Sogd). It is not always easy to distinguish between the images of such Sogdian gods, strongly Indianized under the influence of Shiva's iconography, such as, for example, the God of the wind Veshparkar, similar to Mahadeva, from the images of Shiva himself, whose cult penetrated into Bactria and Sogd. If the dancing god in the “pose of an archer”, with all his Indian features, is included in a typical Sogdian cult scene with worshipers in local clothes with local ritual objects - a portable fire altar and a bunch of branches (leopard), then the already mentioned group with Shiva and Parvati, although it has Sogdian elements, on the whole it hardly allows for an Iranian (in the broad sense of the word) interpretation.

In the wall painting of Penjikent, the Sogdian god Veshparkar is depicted in full growth, his body is wrapped around a cord with bells.

According to N. N. Negmatov, the inscription Veshparkar is a Sogdian translation of the Sanskrit word Vishvakarman and means “creator of everything”. Veshparkar-Vishvakarman, depicted as a four-armed and three-headed man seated on a horse, was one of the three main objects of veneration in pre-Islamic Ustrushana. The Ustrushan image of Veshparkara differs from the Hindu and Buddhist images of Vishvakarman more than the Penjikent image: many Indian beginnings have disappeared, it is not accompanied by a female face, it has fewer arms, there is no flame on the shoulders, and animal heads on the shoulders.

According to B. I. Marshak, in addition to the Sogdian Buddhists and adherents of the Panjakent religion, Veshparkar was also revered by Manichaeans. By the number of preserved images, Veshparkar ranks third among all Sogdian gods.

References

Bibliography
 
 

Central Asia